John Stuart House may refer to:

John Stuart House (Glendale, Kentucky), listed on the National Register of Historic Places in Hardin County, Kentucky
Col. John Stuart House, Charleston, South Carolina, listed on the National Register of Historic Places in Charleston, South Carolina

See also
John Stewart House (disambiguation)
Stuart House (disambiguation)